Sëlva is a  (municipality) in the Val Gardena in South Tyrol, northern Italy, located about  east of the city of Bolzano. The Ladin and Italian place names derive from the Latin word  ("wood").

History

Coat-of-arms
The emblem is quarterly, the first and third corners are per bend and per fess nebuly of argent and gules; the second and third corners are indented of azure and argent on a sable top. The emblem represents the insignia of the Lords of Wolkenstein who built the local castle in 1291. The emblem was adopted in 1968.

Geography

Sëlva borders the following municipalities: Badia, Campitello di Fassa, Canazei, Corvara, San Martin de Tor, and Santa Cristina Gherdëina.

It is perhaps best known as one of the starting points of the Sella Ronda ski tour.

Society

Linguistic distribution
According to the 2011 census, 89.74% of the population speak Ladin, 5.15% Italian and 5.11% German as first language.

Demographic evolution

Climate
Sëlva is characterized by a typical Alpine climate. Summers are rather short and relatively wet. The average daily temperatures in summer lie between 18 and 21 °C, while at night temperatures usually drop to between 6 and 9 °C. Winters are typically cold, long and relatively dry. The average daily temperatures in winter lie between 0 and 2 °C, while at night temperatures usually drop to between -6 and -9 °C. The wettest month is August with 142 mm, while the driest is February with only 21 mm. This data was measured at the weather station in Plan at an altitude of 1,594 metres between 1991 and 2020.

Gallery

Notable people
 Ferdinando Glück (1901–1987) cross-country skier, competed in the men's 50 kilometre event at the 1928 Winter Olympics
 Hans Nogler (1919–2011 in Sëlva) alpine skier, competed in the 1948 Winter Olympics 
 Carlo Senoner (born 1943) retired alpine skier, competed in slalom events at the 1960 and 1968 Winter Olympics
 Adolf Insam (born 1951) ice hockey player, competed in the men's tournament at the 1984 Winter Olympics
 Werner Perathoner (born 1967) former Alpine skier, specialized in downhill and super-G, competed at the 1994 and 1998 Winter Olympics
 Peter Runggaldier (born 1968) former Alpine skier, who specialized in downhill and super-G disciplines, competed at the 1994 and 1998 Winter Olympics, lives in Sëlva
 Karl Unterkircher (1970–2008) mountaineer, opened new mountain routes.

References

External links

 Homepage of the municipality

Municipalities of South Tyrol